Main Intelligence Directorate, abbreviated GRU, was the foreign military intelligence agency of the Soviet Army General Staff of the Soviet Union until 1991. For a few months it was also the foreign military intelligence agency of the newly established Russian Federation until 7 May 1992 when it was dissolved and the Russian GRU took over its activities.

History 

The GRU's first predecessor in Russia formed on October 21, 1918 by secret order under the sponsorship of Leon Trotsky (then the civilian leader of the Red Army), signed by Jukums Vācietis, the first commander-in-chief of the Red Army (RKKA), and by Ephraim Sklyansky, deputy to Trotsky; it was originally known as the Registration Directorate (Registrupravlenie, or RU). Semyon Aralov was its first head. In his history of the early years of the GRU, Raymond W. Leonard writes:

As originally established, the Registration Department was not directly subordinate to the General Staff (at the time called the Red Army Field Staff – Polevoi Shtab). Administratively, it was the Third Department of the Field Staff's Operations Directorate. In July 1920, the RU was made the second of four main departments in the Operations Directorate. Until 1921, it was usually called the Registrupr (Registration Department). That year, following the Soviet–Polish War, it was elevated in status to become the Second (Intelligence) Directorate of the Red Army Staff, and was thereafter known as the Razvedupr. This probably resulted from its new primary peacetime responsibilities as the main source of foreign intelligence for the Soviet leadership. As part of a major re-organization of the Red Army, sometime in 1925 or 1926 the RU (then Razvedyvatelnoe Upravlenye) became the Fourth (Intelligence) Directorate of the Red Army Staff, and was thereafter also known simply as the "Fourth Department." Throughout most of the interwar period, the men and women who worked for Red Army Intelligence called it either the Fourth Department, the Intelligence Service, the Razvedupr, or the RU. […] As a result of the re-organization [in 1926], carried out in part to break up Trotsky's hold on the army, the Fourth Department seems to have been placed directly under the control of the  State Defense Council (Gosudarstvennaia komissiia oborony, or GKO), the successor of the  RVSR. Thereafter its analysis and reports went directly to the GKO and the Politburo, apparently even bypassing the Red Army Staff. 
The first head of the 4th Directorate was Yan Karlovich Berzin, a Latvian Communist and former member of the Cheka, who served until 1935 and again in 1937. He was arrested (May 1938) and subsequently murdered (July 1938) during the so-called "Latvian Operation" of Joseph Stalin's Great Purge.

The GRU in its modern form was created by Joseph Stalin in February 1942, less than a year after the invasion of the Soviet Union by Nazi Germany. From April 1943 the GRU handled human intelligence exclusively outside the USSR.

The GRU had the task of handling all military intelligence, particularly the collection of intelligence of military or political significance from sources outside the Soviet Union. It operated rezidenturas (residencies) all over the world, along with the SIGINT (signals intelligence) station in Lourdes, Cuba, and throughout the Soviet-bloc countries.

The GRU was known in the Soviet government for its fierce independence from the rival "internal intelligence organizations", such as the Main Directorate of State Security (GUGB), State Political Directorate (GPU), MGB, OGPU, NKVD, NKGB, KGB and the First Chief Directorate (PGU). At the time of the GRU's creation, Lenin infuriated the Cheka (the predecessor of the KGB) by ordering it not to interfere with the GRU's operations.

Nonetheless, the Cheka infiltrated the GRU in 1919. That worsened a fierce rivalry between the two agencies, which were both engaged in espionage. The rivalry became even more intense than that between the Federal Bureau of Investigation and Central Intelligence Agency in the US.

The existence of the GRU was not publicized during the Soviet era, but documents concerning it became available in the West in the late 1920s, and it was mentioned in the 1931 memoirs of the first OGPU defector, Georges Agabekov, and described in detail in the 1939 autobiography of Walter Krivitsky (I Was Stalin's Agent), who was the most senior Red Army intelligence officer ever to defect. It became widely known in Russia, and in the West outside the narrow confines of the intelligence community, during perestroika, in part thanks to the writings of "Viktor Suvorov" (Vladimir Rezun), a GRU officer who defected to Great Britain in 1978 and wrote about his experiences in the Soviet military and intelligence services. According to Suvorov, even the General Secretary of the Communist Party of the Soviet Union, when entering the GRU headquarters, needed to go through a security screening. In  Aquarium, "Viktor Suvorov" alleges that during his training and service he was often reminded that exiting the GRU (retiring) was only possible through "The Smoke Stack". This was a GRU reference to a training film shown to him, in which he alleges he watched a condemned agent being burned alive in a furnace.

Activities

SATCOM

During the Cold War, the Sixth Directorate was responsible for monitoring Intelsat communication satellites traffic.

North Korea

GRU Sixth Directorate officers reportedly visited North Korea following the capture (January 1968) of the USS Pueblo, inspecting the vessel and receiving some of the captured equipment.

Heads

Miscellaneous

Defectors 

 Whittaker Chambers, an American journalist and ex-GRU agent who broke with Communism in 1938
 Ismail Akhmedov, a Lieutenant-Colonel of the GRU, who defected to Turkey in 1942. At the end of World War II, the Turks revealed Akhmedov to the Allies, and in 1948 he was interviewed by the first secretary at the British Consulate in Istanbul, in reality the local station chief of the SIS and a Soviet mole, Kim Philby. 
 Iavor Entchev, a communist member of GRU; defected to United States during the Cold War.
 Igor Gouzenko, a GRU cipher clerk who defected to Canada in 1945.
 Walter Krivitsky, a GRU defector who predicted that Joseph Stalin and Adolf Hitler would conclude a Nazi-Soviet non-aggression pact, found dead in 1941.
 Stanislav Lunev, a GRU intelligence officer who defected to U.S. authorities in 1992.
 Oleg Penkovsky, a GRU officer who played an important role during the Cuban Missile Crisis. 
 Dmitri Polyakov, a high-ranking GRU officer who volunteered to spy for the FBI in 1962.
 Juliet Poyntz, an American communist and founding member of the Communist Party of the United States, allegedly kidnapped and killed in New York in 1937 by NKVD agents for an attempt to defect.
 Ignace Reiss, a GRU defector who sent a letter of defection to Stalin in July 1937, found dead in September 1937.
 Viktor Suvorov (pseudonym of Vladimir Bogdanovich Rezun), a GRU officer who defected to the SIS with his wife (also a GRU officer) in Geneva in 1978.
 Kaarlo Tupmi, an illegal GRU officer turned double agent by the FBI in Milwaukee, Wisconsin in 1959.

Agents 

 Stig Bergling
 Joseph Milton Bernstein
 Eugene Franklin Coleman
 Desmond Patrick Costello (alleged)
 Sviatoslav Konstantinovich Mel'nikov
 Klaus Fuchs
 Harold Glasser
 Tanner Greimann
 Rudolf Herrnstadt 
 Arvid Jacobson
 Gerhard Kegel 
 Mary Jane Keeney and Philip Keeney
 Tadeusz Kobylański
 George Koval, a scientist who stole atomic secrets from the Manhattan Project.
 Ursula Kuczynski
 Stefan Litauer
 Seán MacBride
 Robert Osman
 Ward Pigman
 Adam Priess
 Alexander Radó
 Vincent Reno
 Elie Renous
 William Spiegel
 Lydia Stahl
 Irving Charles Velson, Brooklyn Navy Yard; American Labor Party candidate for New York State Senate
 Stig Wennerström

"Illegals" 
 Boris Bukov RU RKKA officer
 Yakov Grigorev
 Vladimir Kvachkov
 Hede Massing
 Richard Sorge
 Moishe Stern
 Joshua Tamer
 Alfred Tilton
 Alexander Ulanovsky
 Ignacy Witczak

Naval agents 
Jack Fahy (Naval GRU), Office of the Coordinator of Inter-American Affairs; Board of Economic Warfare; United States Department of the Interior
Edna Patterson Naval GRU, served in US August 1943 to 1956
Dieter Gerhardt, a commodore who served in South African Navy from 1962 to 1983 and spied for the Soviets for 20 years

See also 
SMERSH

References

Further reading 

 Павел Густерин. Советская разведка на Ближнем и Среднем Востоке в 1920—30-х годах. – Саарбрюккен, 2014. – .
 David M. Glantz. Soviet military intelligence in war. Cass series on Soviet military theory and practice ; 3. London: Cass, 1990. , 
 Raymond W. Leonard. Secret soldiers of the revolution: Soviet military intelligence, 1918–1933.  Westport, Conn.; London: Greenwood Press, 1999. 
 Stanislav Lunev. Through the Eyes of the Enemy: The Autobiography of Stanislav Lunev, Regnery Publishing, Inc., 1998. 
 Viktor Suvorov Aquarium, 1985, Hamish Hamilton Ltd, 
Viktor Suvorov Inside Soviet Military Intelligence, 1984, 
Viktor Suvorov Spetsnaz, 1987, Hamish Hamilton Ltd, 

1918 establishments in Russia
Foreign relations of the Soviet Union
GRU officers
Military of the Soviet Union
Military intelligence agencies
Signals intelligence agencies
Soviet intelligence agencies
Intelligence services of World War II